The Battle of Tamames was lost by part of Marshal Michel Ney's French army under General of Division Jean Marchand in the Peninsular War. The French, advancing out of Salamanca, were met and defeated in battle by a Spanish army on 18 October 1809.

Background
The Spanish campaign in late 1809 started with the Battle of Talavera.

Battle
The Spanish drew their forces in a defensive line on a low ridge above the village of Tamames. Despite being on defensive ground, the battle opened badly for the Spaniards under General del Parque, who resorted to severe measures to restore discipline. The Spanish cavalry was routed early on, but fire from del Parque's own infantry quickly brought their retreat to grief and directed them back into the fight. Spanish artillery positions similarly fell to the French but were retaken at bayonet point by del Parque's gallant infantry.

The French attacked in massed columns but never in enough strength to dislodge the Spanish. While the French had good cavalry (a rare occurrence for the Peninsular Wars), the difficult ground meant that they could not be deployed effectively.

Immediate French losses amounted to about 1,200 killed or wounded on the battlefield. A pursuit by the Spanish cavalry increased these losses twofold; the Spaniards captured the French colours and a 12-pounder. Participants of the battle were later issued a badge reading Venció en Tamames, "[We] conquered at Tamames."

Forces
The VI Corps under Marchand consisted of his own 1st Division (3 battalions each of 6th Light, 39th, 69th and 76th Line), General of Division Maurice Mathieu's 2nd Division (3 bns. each of 25th Light, 27th and 59th Line, and 1 bn. 50th Line), Brig-Gen Jean Lorcet's Corps cavalry brigade (3rd Hussars, 15th Chasseurs, 15th and 25th Dragoons). There were about 9,000 infantry, 2,000 cavalry and 30 cannon.

Del Parque's army included Maj-Gen Martin de la Carrera's Vanguard, Maj-Gen Francisco Xavier Losada's 1st Division, Maj-Gen Conde de Belvedere's 2nd Division, Maj-Gen Francisco Ballasteros's 3rd Division, Maj-Gen Marques de Castrofuerte's 5th Division and the Prince of Anglona's Cavalry Division. Altogether there were about 20,000 infantry, 1,400 cavalry and 30 artillery pieces.

The French lost 1,300 killed, wounded and captured. There were 23 officers killed and 55 wounded, including Lorcet. Del Parque's army suffered 713 killed and wounded and 1 gun captured.

Strategic picture
Del Parque begged the Duke of Wellington to join him in an attempt to overrun Leon and Old Castile. However, the British general refused. Wellington had found the Spanish completely uncooperative during the campaign which culminated in the Battle of Talavera and his subsequent retreat to Portugal. Marchand would avenge his defeat at the Battle of Alba de Tormes in November.

Aftermath
The Spanish campaign in late 1809 proceeded with the second Madrid offensive in the Battle of Ocaña.

Notes

References

External links
Batalla de Tamames
 

Battle of Tamames
Battles of the Peninsular War
Battles involving Spain
Battles involving France
Battle of Tamames
October 1809 events
Battles in Castile and León
History of the province of Salamanca